Joseph-Léon Deslières (June 12, 1893 – March 9, 1986) was a Liberal party member of the House of Commons of Canada. He was born in Sutton, Quebec and became a wholesaler by career.

He was first elected at the Brome—Missisquoi riding in a by-election on 26 May 1952 following the death of incumbent member Henri Gosselin. Deslières was re-elected there in the 1953 federal election and re-elected for another full term in 1957. After completing his term in the 23rd Canadian Parliament, he left federal politics and did not seek re-election in the 1958 election. His wife, Adelia Lebeau died aged 73 in 1966. She was buried in Sutton. Joseph Desliéres died in 1986 in Sutton.

References

External links
 

1893 births
Members of the House of Commons of Canada from Quebec
Liberal Party of Canada MPs
1986 deaths
People from Sutton, Quebec